Abdulwahab Abdelrahman Hedaib Isa Ali Al-Malood (Arabic: عبد الوهاب المالود; born 7 June 1990 in Muharraq, Bahrain) is Bahraini footballer who plays for Al-Hidd in Bahraini Premier League as a midfielder. He is a member of Bahrain national football team. He played for national team at 2011 and 2015 AFC Asian Cups.

International career

International goals
Scores and results list Bahrain's goal tally first.

Honours 
Al Muharraq
AFC Cup: 2021
Individual
AFC Cup Most Valuable Player: 2021

References

External links 
 

1990 births
Living people
Bahraini footballers
Association football midfielders
2011 AFC Asian Cup players
2015 AFC Asian Cup players
Footballers at the 2010 Asian Games
Asian Games competitors for Bahrain
Bahrain international footballers
Al-Muharraq SC players
Hidd SCC players
AFC Cup winning players